The Global Rights Index is a world-wide assessment of trade union and human rights by country.  Updated annually in a report issued by the International Trade Union Confederation, the index rates countries on a scale from 1 (best) through to 5+ (worst).  Ratings are based on 97 indicators derived from the labour standards of the International Labour Organization.  The annual index reports on violations of trade union rights, such as limitations on collective bargaining and the right to strike, inhibiting trade union membership, state surveillance, violence and killings against trade unionists and restrictions on freedom of speech.

Ratings 
The ITUC debuted the index in 2014. It uses the following rating system to indicate the extent of trade union rights violations:

2021 rankings 

According to data collected from 2020 across 149 countries, in terms of violations of trade union rights, the ITUC rated the following as the worst for working people:

 Bangladesh
 Belarus
 Brazil
 Colombia
 Egypt
 Honduras
 Myanmar
 The Philippines
 Turkey
 Zimbabwe

References

 International Trade Union Confederation
International rankings

External links

 ITUC Global Rights Index 2021